The Xiaomi Redmi 1 (also called Hongmi or Red Rice) is a smartphone released in July 2013 in China And August 2013 in Global, developed by the Chinese smartphone company Xiaomi Inc. It is the first product of the Redmi series of smartphones. It comes with a 4.7-inch 720x1080 IPS screen, a MediaTek MT6589T Quad-core 1.5 GHz Cortex-A7 processor and originally runs Android 4.2.2 Jellybean with the MIUI v5 user interface, upgradeable to Android 4.4.2 Kitkat with the MIUI 9 user interface.

Noted for its low price, Redmi 1 was an extremely popular and a demanded smartphone. Xiaomi opted to sell the smartphone online in order to comply with their minimal capital input.

Features

Software 
The Redmi 1 offers Android 4.2.2 Jellybean with the MIUI v5 user interface, upgradeable to Android 4.4.2 Kitkat with the MIUI 9 user interface.

Hardware 
The screen is a 4.7-inch IPS LCD capacitive touchscreen, supporting 16-million colors at a resolution of 1280 x 720 pixels, equating to around 312 pixel-per-inch density. The device features a Mediatek MT6589T which comprises 1.5 GHz Cortex-A7 quad-core central processing unit (CPU) and an Imagination Technologies PowerVR SGX544MP graphics processing unit (GPU), in conjunction with an accelerometer, gyroscope, compass and a proximity sensor. The device is also equipped with 1 GB RAM and 4 GB internal storage, supporting microSD expansion up to 64 GB. Other features include a microphone, GPS, an 8-megapixel rear camera with auto-focus and LED flash, and a 1.3-megapixel front camera. The rear camera is capable of recording videos at 1080p resolution, while the front camera supports 720p resolution recording. The rear of the smartphone features a plain plastic surface with a brushed metal Xiaomi logo at the center-bottom of the rear cover. The smartphone is shipped with a 1,000 mA AC power charger, for charging its 2000/2,050 mAh(min/typ) battery.

Parts Provider
Processor: Mediatek
Modem: Mediatek
PMIC: Mediatek
Wifi/Bluetooth: Mediatek
Connectivity: Mediatek
Audio: Mediatek
RAM: Samsung, Micron
Storage: Samsung, Micron
Display panel: Sharp, AUO
Touch: Focaltech
Camera: Samsung, OmniVision, Atmel
Battery: Coslight

Successor 
Xiaomi Redmi 1S is an Android smartphone developed and produced by  Xiaomi. The Xiaomi Redmi 1S was announced in May 2014.

See also
List of Android devices
CyanogenMod
MIUI

References

1
Android (operating system) devices
Mobile phones introduced in 2013
Computer-related introductions in 2014
Discontinued smartphones
Mobile phones with user-replaceable battery